Greatest Radio Hits is a compilation album by Bruce Hornsby. The album was released in Australia on September 8, 2003, and in the United States on January 13, 2004.

Tracks 1 to 5 and 8 to 10 are recordings from Hornsby's time with his band, The Range. Tracks 11 to 15 are from Hornsby's period as a solo artist; tracks 6 and 7 are solo performances, recorded live in August 2002. The album's liner notes advise that tracks 6, 7 and 15 are previously unreleased versions.

Track listing

References

Bruce Hornsby albums
2004 greatest hits albums
RCA Records compilation albums
Legacy Recordings compilation albums